Gregory Z. Gutin (born 17 January 1957) is a scholar in theoretical computer science and discrete mathematics. He received his PhD in Mathematics in 1993 from Tel Aviv University under the supervision of Noga Alon. Since September 2000 Gutin has been Professor in Computer Science at Royal Holloway, University of London.

Gutin's research interests are in algorithms and complexity, access control, graph theory and combinatorial optimization. He co-authored with Joergen Bang-Jensen two editions of a monograph  The first edition is available for free. The monograph has already attracted over 3100 citations in papers in such diverse areas as physics, biology, economics, ecology, meteorology and computer science. Gutin co-edited with Abraham Punnen the book  Gutin also co-edited with Jørgen Bang-Jensen the book 
He has more than two hundred fifty papers and an estimated h-index of 41.

Gutin was the recipient of the Royal Society Wolfson Research Merit Award in 2014, and the best paper awards at SACMAT 2015, 2016 and
2021. In January 2017 there was a workshop celebrating Gutin's 60th birthday. In 2017, he became a member of Academia Europaea.

References

External links
 

British computer scientists
Living people
Tel Aviv University alumni
British mathematicians
1957 births
Israeli computer scientists
Israeli mathematicians
Members of Academia Europaea